Megachile apicalis is a species of bee in the family Megachilidae. It was described by Spinola in 1808. It is commonly observed in Europe and the Mediterranean region, but instances have been reported in North America.

References

Apicalis
Insects described in 1808